Helopelopia is a genus of non-biting midges in the subfamily Tanypodinae of the bloodworm family Chironomidae.

Species
H. cornuticaudata (Walley, 1925)
H. pilicaudata (Walley, 1925)

References

Tanypodinae